Heart of Empire, or the Legacy of Luther Arkwright  is a limited series by Bryan Talbot, published in nine monthly parts in 1999 by American company Dark Horse Comics.

It is a sequel to his earlier work The Adventures of Luther Arkwright, set twenty-three years later, and centres on Arkwright's daughter Victoria.

Overview

While the earlier work was highly experimental in its storytelling, with flashbacks and other multiple storylines running at different speeds and told in different styles, only resolving into a single narrative in the later part of the book, Heart of Empire is straightforwardly linear and drawn in a consistent style, with computer colouring by Angus McKie and lettering by Ellie DeVille. The pacing of the story is made more natural by the decision to vary the page count of the monthly comics to fit the demands of the storytelling. The story is nevertheless full of mythological, historical, artistic and political references, symbolism and subliminal imagery. Many events echo those in The Adventures of Luther Arkwright.

As well as a collected paperback edition, Heart of Empire is available as a CD-ROM containing scans of the pencil roughs, black-and-white inks, final colour pages and high resolution versions and a great deal of annotation and supplementary material from Bryan. It also includes scans of the whole of The Adventures of Luther Arkwright, from the recently created digital remastered version at the best resolution that it has ever been seen in.  The CD is in some ways the "Director's cut" of the comic and was created to answer the perennial "where do you get your ideas from?" question asked by fans.  The first chapter of it has been put online for free viewing due to the inherent difficulty in explaining what it contains.

Synopsis

The story is largely set on the same parallel on which the key events of Luther Arkwright occurred. Twenty-three years have passed (putting the date of the events at 2007), and England has emerged from its artificially-prolonged Civil War to become the predominant world power under the autocratic rule of its psychic Queen Anne. The decadent court exhibits a mixture of Elizabethan, Restoration and Victorian styles. Ordinary people randomly "disappear" to an unknown fate in St. George's Chapel, Windsor at Windsor Castle.

Anne's only heir is Princess Victoria, her daughter by the long-vanished Luther Arkwright, born during the climactic battle twenty-three years earlier. Victoria is an engineering genius, but suffers constantly from nausea and headaches. Victoria's twin brother Henry was assassinated at the age of ten, but when Victoria is told she resembles the revolutionary leader Gabriel Shelley, she becomes fascinated by the possibility that he is her brother, and starts a quest to learn about the circumstances of Henry's death. Meanwhile both a Papal Envoy and a group of fascists within the government plan to assassinate Anne and Victoria in order to seize the Empire for the Roman Catholic Church and themselves, respectively. Furthermore, the advanced society of parallel "zero-zero" has detected an imminent cataclysm centred on Victoria's world, and tries in vain to contact Luther.

Gabriel Shelley is not Henry, but Victoria's contact with him helps open her eyes to the oppressive nature of her mother's empire. It also opens her eyes in other ways, as she accidentally takes a hallucinogen instead of a migraine remedy from his collection of home-made medicines. Under the influence of the potion, she makes her first jump across the parallels to meet her father. They return to Victoria's world to defeat the true Heart of Empire and source of the imminent catastrophe - a psychic monster lurking in St George's Chapel, created by Anne's attempts to keep her son Henry alive. Anne is mortally wounded in combat with the Papal Envoy, and Victoria intervenes decisively to stop a massacre of democracy campaigners and kill the fascist ringleaders. In the final scene she abdicates the throne and dissolves the Empire.

External links
Bryan Talbot homepage
 Heart of Empire homepage
Heart of Empire CD-Rom free first chapter

1999 comics debuts
British comics titles
Comic book limited series
Comics about parallel universes
Comics by Bryan Talbot
Comics publications
Dark Horse Comics limited series
Dark Horse Comics titles
Parallel universes in fiction
Science fiction comics
Steampunk comics